Laudatio Turiae ("In praise of Turia") is a tombstone engraved with a carved epitaph that is a husband's eulogy of his wife. It was made in the late 1st century BC.  It portrays the love of a husband for his loyal wife.

Tombstone 
The frequently moving eulogy inscribed on the stone is addressed from a husband to his deceased wife, lauding her virtues, self-sacrificing love, and unflinching loyalty toward him when she was still alive.  The stone itself is broken, and parts have been found scattered around the city of Rome, although some sections remain lost.  At 180 lines, the "Laudatio Turiae" is currently the longest surviving personal inscription from Classical Rome.

Inscription 
The inscription gives a unique insight into the late 1st century Roman world during the rise of Augustus Caesar, as its extended history of the life of the author's wife addresses many aspects of Roman society and civil life.  The wife's selfless deeds in defense of her persecuted husband range from sending him jewelry and money when he was in exile to offering him a divorce so he could have an heir—the couple was unable to have a child together.  Her husband also lovingly describes her virtues, among which he includes weaving, obedience, faithfulness to family, and religious purity.  According to the inscription, her first accomplishment worthy of praise was avenging her parents’ murder, which gives a rather surprising look into the roles of women within the family and society.  The husband also says the marriage was unusual, because it lasted forty years with her dying first while he was much older. One of the few named figures in the inscription is Marcus Lepidus, who refused to reinstate the husband despite Caesar's order to do so. The husband praises his wife's willingness to endure verbal and physical abuse from Lepidus on his behalf as she attempted to plead the husband's case publicly.

Identities 
This inscription  is traditionally known as the "Laudatio Turiae," "The Praise of Turia," because its subject was generally identified with Curia, the wife of Quintus Lucretius Vespillo, consul in 19 BC, on the basis of comparison with the histories of Valerius Maximus (6, 7, 2) and Appian (Bell.civ. 4, 44), which report that Turia saved her husband in much the same way described in the inscription. William Warde Fowler stated, "...there is a very strong probability that her name was Turia, and that he was the certain Q. Lucretius Vespillo..."

However, the extant remains of the Laudatio Turiae are missing the fragmented piece that contains the identities of both the husband and wife, so they are not actually named on the extant inscription. As a result, the identification with Turia is no longer generally accepted.

Location 
The Laudatio Turiae is currently housed in the Museo Nazionale Romano at the Terme di Diocleziano (Baths of Diocletian) in Rome.

See also
 Women in ancient Rome

Notes

References 
 "Civil War." Appian
 Appian, Book IV English
 "Book VI, Chapter VII." Valere Maxime
 Valère Maxime, Book VI, Chapter VII Latin
 The Roman Law Library by Yves Lassard and Alexandr Koptev
 Gordon, A.E., "A New Fragment of the Laudatio Turiae" AJA 54 (1950) 223–226
 Horsfall, N., "Some Problems in the Laudatio Turiae" Bull. Inst. Clas. Stud. 30 85–98
 Wistrand, Erik, The so-called Laudatio Turiae (Berlingska Boktryckeriet, 1976) 
 Fontana, Laura, "Laudatio Turiae e propaganda augustea: quando anche la morte è politica", Milano: Ledizioni 2021. . 

Burial monuments and structures
Acknowledgements of death
Latin inscriptions
Archaeological discoveries in Italy
1st-century inscriptions